Pashchimanchal Campus, formerly known also as Western Region Campus (WRC) is one of the four constituent campuses of Tribhuvan University, Institute of Engineering in Nepal. 

The Pashchimanchal campus became operational from 1987 with assistance from the World Bank and UNDP/ILO. Initially, technician courses were offered at the campus along with diploma courses. However, Tribhuvan University Institute of Engineering has phased out the diploma stream and henceforth stopped enrollment in this stream after 2069 BS. Now it offers engineering courses in six disciplines at the bachelor level and three disciplines at the master's level.

For admission, students must pass an entrance exam conducted by IOE. Quotas are available for disadvantaged groups.

Location 
The scenic Pashchimanchal Campus is located in the northern part of Pokhara the regional headquarters of the Western Development Region about 210 km west of Kathmandu, spreading on 312 ropanis land in a scenic section of Pokhara valley in the western development region of Nepal. It is located in the Lamachaur-16, Pokhara near to famous Mahendra Cave, Chamere Cave, and Seti Gorge.

Courses 
The courses offered by Pashchimanchal Campus and their capacity are as follows:
 Mechanical and Automobile Engineering (Bachelor)
 Civil Engineering (Bachelor)
 Electronics, Communication and Information Engineering (Bachelor)
 Electrical Engineering (Bachelor)
 Geomatics Engineering (Bachelor)
 Computer Engineering (Bachelor)
 Communication and Knowledge Engineering (Masters)
 Infrastructure Engineering and Management (Masters)
 Electrical Engineering in Distributed Generations(Masters)

Departments

Department of Civil Engineering 
The department has been in operation since the establishment of the campus. Initially, a three-year diploma course in Civil Engineering was offered. A four-year Bachelor's program in Civil Engineering was launched in 2056 B.S.

Department of Geomatics Engineering 
The department has been established from 2077 BS.A four-year Bachelor's program in Geomatics Engineering was launched in 2069 B.S.

Department of Automobile and Mechanical Engineering 
The department has been in operation since the establishment of the campus. Initially, a three-year diploma course in Mechanical Engineering and Automobile Engineering was offered. A four-year bachelor's program in Mechanical Engineering was launched in 2069 B.S. The campus now offers undergraduate studies in Mechanical and  Automobile Engineering with 48 students capacity each.

The head of the Department of Automobile and Mechanical Engineering is Dr. Durga Bastakoti.

Department of Electrical Engineering 
The department has been operating since the establishment of the campus. Initially, a three-year diploma course in Electrical Engineering was offered. A four years bachelor program in Electrical Engineering was launched in 2067 B.S.

Department of Electronics and Computer Engineering 
The department was established in 2053 B.S. Initially, three-year diploma courses in Electronics & Communication and Computer Engineering were offered. A four-year bachelor program began in 2062 B.S., and a four-year bachelor program in Computer Engineering was launched in 2069 B.S. According to recent meeting of IOE board Electronics and Communication Engineering is renamed as Electronics and Information Technology which will more emphasized towards the modern engineering syllabus. The HOD of the Department is Laxmi Prasad Bastola .

Courses offered
Bachelor's degree in Electronics and Communication Engineering (4 years, day shift)
Bachelor's degree in Computer Engineering (4 years, day shift)
CIT (Center of Information Technology ) 

The CIT has 40/40 Mbit/s of dedicated wire (optical fiber backbone) and wireless facilities to hostels and administration. CIT not only provides internet facilities but also conducts training on engineering packages of information technology. It has more than 50 terminals connected to broadband Internet via wireless.

Department of Engineering Science & Humanities 
The department has been in existence since the establishment of the campus. The department also manages courses like Communication English.

Laboratories 
The campus has 22 laboratories, six in engineering and two in science, as well as a language lab:
 Civil Engineering
Engineering Materials testing Lab
Soil testing Lab
Hydraulics Lab
Structural Lab(cement, reinforcement, brick and concrete testing)
Hydro Power Lab
Water supply Lab
Transportation Lab
 Electrical Engineering
Electric Power Lab
Electrical Machines Lab
Automatic & Digital Control Lab
Power Electronics Lab
Electrical Instrumentation & Measurement Lab
Micro Hydro Lab
 Electronics and Computer Engineering
Digital Electronics Lab
Communication Lab
Computer Lab(Basic Computer lab, Advanced Computer lab, Computer Repair & Maintenance lab, Internet lab, Multimedia lab)
Basic Electronics Lab
 Mechanical Engineering
Thermal Engineering Lab
Hydraulics Laboratory 
Engineering Science and Humanities Department
Engineering Chemistry Lab
Engineering Physics Lab
Communication Lab

Workshops 
There are 11 workshops on the campus.
Civil department
Carpentry workshop
Wet-construction workshop
Plumbing workshop

Electrical department
Electrical Installation
Basic Electrical and Repair & Maintenance workshops.

Mechanical department
Machining workshop
Fitting & Maintenance workshop
Arc Welding and Foundry/Forgin Workshop
Gas Welding & Sheet Metal workshop
Automobile workshop

Electronics
Repair and Maintenance workshop

Accommodation

Sports 
Pashchimanchal Campus provides sporting facilities to its students and faculty. These include: 
Football ground with a stadium and cricket pitch within the football ground
Table Tennis courts
Volleyball courts
Badminton court
Basketball Court

Students Clubs And Associations 

Geomatics Engineering Students Association of Nepal(GESAN)
Empower
Happy Club
Robotics Club
E-Gen
Club of Technical Students (CoTS)
Innovative Computer Engineering Students' Society (i-CES)
Talking Minds - A group of Innovative Students
Society of Innovative Mechanical Engineering Students (SIMES)
Nepal Engineering Students Society (NESS)
Algorithm Club
Civil Engineering Students Society (CESS)
HG Pariwaar
FemTech
Team DELTA

And many other technical and regional students societies for cultural and regional identity and conservations.
There are mainly three student political organisation in Paschimanchal Campus..
Akhil (Revolutionary )
All Nepal National Free Student Union 
Nepal Student Union 
Akhil Revolutionary ( Biplav)
Naya Shakti Student Union 
Akhil 6th

See also 

 Institute of Engineering homepage
 Pulchok Campus, IOE
 Thapathali Campus, IOE
 Purwanchal Campus, IOE
 Tribhuvan University
 Kathmandu University
 Pokhara University
 Mid-western University

References 

Tribhuvan University
Engineering universities and colleges in Nepal
Education in Pokhara
Educational institutions established in 1987
1987 establishments in Nepal